Canales is a Spanish surname, and may refer to:

Anel Canales (born 1978), Panamanian footballer
Antonio Canales Rosillo (1802–1852), a 19th-century Mexican politician, surveyor, and military general
Blanca Canales (1906–1996), educator and Puerto Rican Nationalist
Carla Dirlikov Canales, American mezzo-soprano singer
Diosa Canales (born 1987), Venezuelan singer, actress, and model
Enrique Canales (1936–2007), technologist, editor, political analyst, painter and sculptor
Evaristo Merino Canales (died 1930), ninth Mayor of the commune of Pichilemu
Felipe González de Canales, one of the founders of the Escuelas Familiares Agrarias (Agrarian Family Schools)
Fernanda Canales (born 1974), Mexican architect, designer, critic and curator of Mexican architecture
Fernando Canales Clariond (born 1946), Mexican politician and businessman affiliated with the National Action Party (PAN)
Fernando J. Canales (born 1959), former freestyle swimmer from Puerto Rico and swimming coach
Francisco Canales (born 1957), Puerto Rican former swimmer who competed in the 1976 Summer Olympics
Gustavo Canales (born 1982), Argentine-born Chilean footballer
Jimena Canales, Mexican-American physicist and engineer, award-winning historian of science and author
Joaquín Canales (born 1962), Salvadoran former footballer
Johnny Canales (born 1947), former Tejano singer, host of The Johnny Canales Show
Jose Antonio Canales Rivera (born 1974), Spanish bullfighter
José Ferrer Canales (1913–2005), educator, writer and a pro-independence political activist
José Francisco Canales (born 1987), football goalkeeper
José Tomás Canales (1877–1976), American lawyer, writer, businessman, and politician
Juan Bosco Maino Canales (died 1976), photographer, political activist, opponent of Augusto Pinochet's regime in Chile
Juan Díaz Canales (born 1972), Spanish comics artist and an animated film director, co-creator of Blacksad
Kaleb Canales (born 1978), American basketball assistant coach
Laura Canales (1954–2005), American Tejano musician, an original inductee in the Tejano Roots Hall of Fame
Lorea Canales, lawyer, journalist, translator and writer
Lourdes Quiñones Canales (born 1953), Mexican politician affiliated with the PRI
Manuel Martínez Canales (1928–2014), known as Manolín, Spanish professional footballer
María Torre Canales (born 1974), Mexican politician from the New Alliance Party
Marisa Canales (born 1959), Mexican flute player
Marta Canales (1893–1986), Chilean violinist, choral conductor and composer
Máximo Canales or Paul del Rio (born 1943), Venezuelan sculptor, painter and revolutionary
Mike Canales (born 1961), American college football coach and former player
Nemesio Canales (1878–1923), Puerto Rican writer, politician and activist who defended women's civil rights
Nicolás Canales (born 1985), Chilean footballer that plays as a striker for Deportes Temuco
Ricardo Canales (born 1982), Honduran footballer
Sergio Canales (born 1991), Spanish professional footballer
Susana Canales (1933–2021), Spanish film and television actress
Terry Canales, Democratic member of the Texas House of Representatives, serving since 2013
Vic Canales, American radio and television personality of Spanish descent
Viola Canales (born 1957), American writer originally from McAllen, Texas

See also
Canales, Spain
Chozas de Canales, Spain
Villa Canales, Guatemala
Canales Reservoir, Spain
Canales de la Sierra, Spain
Llera de Canales, Tamaulipas, Mexico
Canale (disambiguation)
Canal (disambiguation)
Canals (disambiguation)